The Hunter's Moon is a 1999 American action drama direct-to-video directed by Richard C. Weinman, and stars Burt Reynolds, Keith Carradine and Hayley DuMond. Although the film had a limited theatrical release, it was not generally seen until it was released on home video.

Synopsis
In the Depression-era, Turner is a World War I vet who is haunted not only by memories of the war, but by the civil and economic unrest of the time. He stumbles upon a beautiful backwoods mountainside where he falls hopelessly in love with Flo, the daughter of tyrannical landowner Clayton Samuels, who disapproves his daughter's relationship and will stop at nothing to end it.

External links
 

1990s action films
1999 films
American direct-to-video films
1990s English-language films